Affleck Canal is an inlet in Southeast Alaska, United States It extends  north from Sumner Strait, nearly cutting Kuiu Island in two. It was first charted in 1793 by Joseph Whidbey, master of  during George Vancouver's 1791–1795 expedition. Vancouver named it for Admiral Philip Affleck, RN.

References

Inlets of Alaska
Bodies of water of Prince of Wales–Hyder Census Area, Alaska